Steve Michel Mounié (born 29 September 1994) is a Beninese professional footballer who plays as a forward for Ligue 1 club Brest, whom he captains, and the Benin national team.

Club career

Montpellier
Mounié is a Montpellier HSC youth academy graduate. He made his first team debut on 28 October 2014 in a 2014–15 Coupe de la Ligue round of 32 home match against AC Ajaccio, replacing Jean Deza after 86 minutes; Montpellier lost the match 1–0.

On 31 August 2015, Mounié was loaned to Nîmes Olympique of Ligue 2 for the rest of the 2015–16 season. He was the club's top scorer for the season, with 11 goals in 33 competitive matches, all of them scored during the league campaign.

On 29 June 2016, Mounié extended his contract with Montpellier by two years to 30 June 2019.

On 11 March 2017, Mounié scored for the fifth consecutive Ligue 1 match in a 3–2 home loss to Nantes; it was his 13th league goal of the season.

Huddersfield Town
On 5 July 2017, Mounié joined newly-promoted Premier League club Huddersfield Town on a four-year deal for a club record fee of €13 million (£11.5 million) plus add-ons. The record fee surpassed the previous record £8 million (initial fee) that the club spent on Aaron Mooy from Manchester City a week earlier.

Mounié made his competitive debut on 12 August 2017, scoring twice in Huddersfield's first match in the division, a 3–0 win at Crystal Palace. On 11 February 2018, he scored, assisted  Mooy and forced an own goal in a 4–1 home win over AFC Bournemouth.

Brest
On 9 September 2020, Mounié signed with Ligue 1 side Brest.

International career
Mouniè played for Benin national team at the 2019 Africa Cup of Nations where the team reached the quarter-finals.

Career statistics

Club

International

Scores and results list Benin's goal tally first, score column indicates score after each Mounié goal.

References

External links

1994 births
Living people
People from Parakou
Beninese footballers
Association football forwards
Benin international footballers
2019 Africa Cup of Nations players
Ligue 1 players
Ligue 2 players
Premier League players
Montpellier HSC players
Nîmes Olympique players
Huddersfield Town A.F.C. players
Stade Brestois 29 players
Beninese expatriate footballers
Beninese expatriate sportspeople in France
Expatriate footballers in France
Beninese expatriate sportspeople in England
Expatriate footballers in England